Tylochromis is a genus of African fishes in the family Cichlidae. They are the only members of the tribe Tylochromini. Many of the species are endemic to the Congo River Basin, but species also are found in Lake Tanganyika, Cameroon, Nigeria, and West Africa from Ghana to Gambia.

Species
The 18 recognized species in this genus are:
 Tylochromis aristoma Stiassny, 1989
 Tylochromis bangwelensis Regan, 1920 (hump-backed bream)
 Tylochromis elongatus Stiassny, 1989
 Tylochromis intermedius (Boulenger, 1916)
 Tylochromis jentinki (Steindachner, 1894)
 Tylochromis labrodon Regan, 1920
 Tylochromis lateralis (Boulenger, 1898)
 Tylochromis leonensis Stiassny, 1989
 Tylochromis microdon Regan, 1920
 Tylochromis mylodon Regan, 1920 (mweru hump-backed bream)
 Tylochromis polylepis (Boulenger, 1900)
 Tylochromis praecox Stiassny, 1989
 Tylochromis pulcher Stiassny, 1989
 Tylochromis regani Stiassny, 1989
 Tylochromis robertsi Stiassny, 1989
 Tylochromis sudanensis Daget, 1954
 Tylochromis trewavasae Stiassny, 1989
 Tylochromis variabilis Stiassny, 1989

References

 
Pseudocrenilabrinae
Freshwater fish genera
Cichlid fish of Africa
Cichlid genera
Taxa named by Charles Tate Regan
Taxonomy articles created by Polbot